is a passenger railway station located in the town of Shin'onsen, Mikata District, Hyōgo, Japan, operated by West Japan Railway Company (JR West).

Lines

Station layout
The station consists of one ground-level side platform serving  single bi-directional track. The station is unattended.

Adjacent stations

History
Moroyose Station opened on July 18, 1931 as a temporary stop that was in operation only seasonally. It was upgraded to a full station on June 1, 1938.

Passenger statistics
In fiscal 2016, the station was used by an average of 49 passengers daily

Surrounding area
 Moroyose Beach
Moroyose Post Office
 Japan National Route 178

See also
List of railway stations in Japan

References

External links

 Station Official Site

Railway stations in Hyōgo Prefecture
Sanin Main Line
Railway stations in Japan opened in 1931
Shin'onsen, Hyōgo